Favel Parry Wordsworth (April 1850 – August 12, 1888) was a professional baseball player. He appeared in 12 games for the Elizabeth Resolutes of the National Association in 1873, primarily as a shortstop.

References

Major League Baseball shortstops
Elizabeth Resolutes players
Baseball players from New York (state)
19th-century baseball players
1850 births
1888 deaths
Burials at the Cemetery of the Evergreens